Psammodromus is a small genus of sand lizards of the family Lacertidae. It has six described species, which are found in European and North African countries next to the Mediterranean.

Species
The following species are recognized as being valid.

Psammodromus algirus  - large psammodromus, Algerian psammodromus, Algerian sand racer
Psammodromus blanci  - Blanc's sand racer, Blanc's psammodromus
Psammodromus edwarsianus  - East Iberian sand racer, East Iberian psammodromus
Psammodromus hispanicus  – Spanish psammodromus
Psammodromus manuelae
Psammodromus microdactylus  – small-fingered psammodromus, green psammodromus
Psammodromus occidentalis 

Nota bene: A binomial authority in parentheses indicates that the species was originally described in a genus other than Psammodromus.

References

Further reading
Boulenger GA (1887).  Catalogue of the Lizards in the British Museum (Natural History). Second Edition. Volume III. Lacertidæ ... London: Trustees of the British Museum (Natural History). (Taylor and Francis, printers). xii + 575 pp. + Plates I-XL. (Genus Psammodromus, pp. 46–47).
Fitzinger LI (1826). Neue Classification der Reptilien nach ihren natürlichen Verwandtschaften. Nebst einer Verwandtschafts-tafel und einem Verzeichnisse der Reptilien-Sammlung des K.K. zoologischen Museum's zu Wien. Vienna: J.G. Heubner. five unnumbered + 67 pp. + one plate. (Psammodromus, new genus, p. 22). (in German and Latin).
López, Pilar; Martín, José (2009). "Lipids in femoral gland secretions of male lizards, Psammodromus hispanicus ". Biochemical Systematics and Ecology 37 (4): 304–307.

 
Lizard genera
Taxa named by Leopold Fitzinger